This is a partial list of Canadians who are Métis people.

The Métis are a specific group of people, primarily from Manitoba, Saskatchewan, and Alberta, who have Indigenous (primarily Cree) and European (primarily French) ancestry. They have a shared history and Michif language.

Prominent Métis

Historical

Howard Adams, Métis activist, author, and leader
Andre Beauchemin, Métis; First Member of the Legislative Assembly of Manitoba for St. Vital (French Party) 1870–1874. In November 1872, Beauchemin offered to resign his seat in the Manitoba assembly so that Riel could be elected in a by-election
Pierre Bottineau, Minnesota frontiersman, surveyor, diplomat and translator
Michel "Mitch" Bouyer, Métis of French Canadian and Sioux ancestry; interpreter and guide in the Old West; lead scout with the US Seventh Cavalry; died along with Lt.Col. George Armstrong Custer at the Battle of Little Bighorn on June 25, 1876
James P. Brady, Métis politician and activist
Pierre Delorme, Métis politician and activist. Elected as a Member of Parliament in 1871, defeated in 1874 and re-elected in 1878.
Gabriel Dumont, Métis military leader during the North-West Rebellion
Cuthbert Grant, Métis political and military leader
James Isbister,  was a Canadian Métis leader and he is considered to be the founder of the city of Prince Albert, Saskatchewan.
Thomas McKay, was a Metis farmer and political figure who was the first mayor of Prince Albert, Saskatchewan.
John Norquay, Métis politician, Premier of Manitoba from 1878 to 1887
Malcolm Norris, Métis politician, activist, and leader. Norris was a founder and the first vice-president of the first Alberta Métis organization (1932) called the Association des Métis d’Alberta et des Territories du Nord-Ouest  (Alberta Métis Association). In 1964, he headed the Métis Association of Northern Saskatchewan.
Louis Riel, Métis leader who led the Red River Rebellion in 1869 - 1870, the provisional government of Rupert's Land, Manitoba's entry into Confederation in 1870; later led the North-West Rebellion in 1885 Riel was elected three times to the House of Commons for Provencher riding; first, in the general election of 1873, the government subsequently resigned over the Pacific Scandal in November 1873. Riel was reelected in February 1874, then expelled, then ran in the subsequent by-election, was reelected and expelled again.
Guillaume Sayer, a Métis fur trader whose trial was a turning point in the ending of the monopoly of the Hudson's Bay Company (HBC) of the fur trade in North America. 
Louis Schmidt, Métis politician, Riel's Secretary and, in their youth, Riel's classmate. Born in 1844 he was known as Louis Laferté until Bishop Taché changed it in 1858. Louis Schmidt made the first of numerous petitions on behalf of the Métis' to the federal government over rights to their lands and their call for proper political representation. See Louis Schmidt: A Forgotten Métis  in  Riel and the Métis  Ed. A.S Lussier (1979) Manitoba Métis Federation Press.

Architects 
Douglas Cardinal, architect; of Métis and Blackfoot ancestry. He designed the Museum of Canadian History and did the building designs for the Oujé-Bougoumou community of the James Bay Cree. This work won the “We the People” United Nations Community Award.

Artists and writers

 Keith Barker, playwright
 Be'sha Blondin, Deme Elder, health activist and founder and director of Northern Integrated Culture with the Environment (Northern ICE), which strengthens Aboriginal communities in the North.
 Katherine Boyer, Métis/Settler artist.
 Terril Calder, animator and artist
 Joe Fafard (artist), Métis artist from Saskatchewan whose work has been featured across Canada and around the world
 Sandra Birdsell, daughter of a Métis man and a Russian Mennonite woman; based her award-winning novel Children of the Day in part on her parents' experiences in Manitoba in the 1920s to 1950s
 Robert Boyer (1948–2004); Métis Cree artist, best known for his politically charged "Blanket Statements" series of paintings
Alec Butler
 Maria Campbell, Métis writer and filmmaker; born in northern Saskatchewan in 1940; brought the struggles of modern-day Métis and Aboriginal people to the public through her breakthrough book, Halfbreed (1973), and the collaborative play, Jessica (1982); captured the sound and song of traditional stories through her work in dialect, Stories of the Road Allowance People (1996)
Laura de Jonge, Métis family advocate, corporate social responsibility practitioner, filmmaker and magazine founder.
 Cherie Dimaline, writer, was awarded the Anskohk Fiction Book of the Year Award in 2013.
 Danis Goulet, filmmaker
 George R. D. Goulet, best-selling Métis author; books include The Trial of Louis Riel: Justice and Mercy Denied, The Metis: Memorable Events and Memorable Personalities, and The Métis in British Columbia: From Fur Trade Outposts to Colony
 Dylan Miner, Métis printmaker, writer and conceptual artist
 Rick Rivet (born 1949), painter
 Gregory Scofield, acclaimed poet, beadwork artist, dramatist, non-fiction writer, activist and educator
 Jesse Thistle, academic and writer
 Kamala Todd, community planner, filmmaker, curator
 Loretta Todd, filmmaker, producer, cultural theorist
 Katherena Vermette, writer
 Rhayne Vermette, filmmaker
  Christine Welsh, documentary filmmaker and academic

Musicians 
Arlette Alcock, musician, songwriter, and social activist
Celeigh Cardinal, singer-songwriter
Berk Jodoin, singer-songwriter
Jani Lauzon, musician
Andrea Menard, actress, playwright, and singer
Amanda Rheaume, singer-songwriter
Sister Ray, singer-songwriter
Kinnie Starr, musician
Laura Vinson, musician
Ruby Waters, musician

Politicians, activists, lawyers, physicians and judges
André Beauchemin Métis politician in Manitoba.
Rod Bruinooge, Métis; Member of Parliament for Winnipeg South (Conservative Party of Canada); Parliamentary Secretary to the Minister of Indian Affairs & Northern Development; Federal Interlocutor for Métis and Non-Status Indians from 2005 until the fall of 2008
Brian Bowman, Métis; mayor of Winnipeg
Thelma J Chalifoux, Métis; community activist; First Aboriginal Woman appointed to the Senate of Canada on November 26, 1997, established Michif Cultural and Resource Institute,
Clément Chartier, Métis Canadian leader who served as President of the World Council of Indigenous Peoples between 1984–87 and vice-president between 1993 and 1997.
David Chartrand, Métis politician and aboriginal activist in Manitoba, Canada, who has been the leader of the Manitoba Metis Federation since 1997 to the present.
Todd Ducharme, Métis; appointed as a judge in 2004 of the Ontario Supreme Court of Justice.  
Shelly Glover, Métis; Member of Parliament for Saint-Boniface (Conservative Party of Canada) 2008–2015; Parliamentary Secretary for Official Languages 
Carole James, former British Columbia New Democratic Party leader; Métis 
Bertha Clark-Jones, Cree-Métis activist and Royal Canadian Air Force member. 
Tamara Lich, Canadian administrator, musician, and activist.
Rick Laliberte, Canadian former politician from Beauval, Saskatchewan who is fluent in Cree-Michif. 
Glen McCallum, Métis politician from Pinehouse, Saskatchewan who was first elected to serve as President of Métis Nation—Saskatchewan on 27 May 2017 and was re-elected on 29 May 2021. 
Bob McLeod, is a former Canadian politician. 
D'Arcy McNickle, writer, Native American activist, college professor and administrator, and anthropologist of Irish and Cree-Métis descent. He enrolled in the Salish Kootenai nation, as his mother has come to Montana with the Métis red river rebellion refugees. 
Gerald Morin, Métis politician who served as president of the Métis National Council and the Métis Nation—Saskatchewan, also serving as vice president for the latter. 
Derrick O'Keefe, Rabble.ca editor; Canadian anti-war movement leader; Métis 
Dan Vandal, Métis; Member of Parliament for Saint-Boniface and Saint-Vital (Liberal Party of Canada) 2015-current; Parliamentary Secretary for Indigenous Services

Sports
Calen Addison, professional ice hockey player for the Minnesota Wild
Arron Asham, professional ice hockey player

René Bourque, NHL hockey player; from Lac La Biche, Alberta; a Métis
Sharon Bruneau, bodybuilder and fitness model
Kyle Chipchura, NHL player, of Métis ancestry
Connor Dewar, professional ice hockey player for the Minnesota Wild
Kerri Einarson, Canadian national curling champion
Theoren Fleury, Canadian former professional ice hockey player
Travis Hamonic, professional ice hockey player for the Ottawa Senators
Dwight King, professional ice hockey player for the Los Angeles Kings
Heather Mandoli, Canadian Olympic Rower; of Métis ancestry
Vic Mercredi, Atlanta Flames first round draft pick  
Kevin O'Toole, 1996 North American light heavyweight bodybuilding champion
Wade Redden, NHL defenceman; of Métis ancestry
Sheldon Souray, NHL defenceman; of Métis ancestry
Bryan Trottier, NHL Hall of Fame center

Others

Tantoo Cardinal, actress; of Métis and Cree ancestry
Roseanne Supernault, actress; Métis of Cree descent
Zoe Todd, academic
Siera Bearchell, Miss Universe Canada 2016; of Métis descent

See also

List of Canadian Inuit
List of First Nations people
Indigenous Canadian personalities

Notes

Lists of Canadian people by ethnic or national origin
Lists of indigenous Canadian people
 
Lists of people by ethnicity